Orlando Aryee is a Ghanaian politician and a Stationery Supplier. He served as a member of the first parliament of the fourth republic of Ghana for the Okaikwei South constituency in the Greater Accra region of Ghana.

Early life and education 
Orlando Aryee was born on 8 June 1954. he attended Ebenezer Secondary School where he obtained a GCE Ordinary Level.

Career 
Orlando Aryee was a former member of the first parliament of the fourth republic of Ghana for Okaikwei South constituency and a Stationery Supplier.

Politics 
Orlando Aryee was first elected during the 1992 Ghanaian parliamentary election as member of the first parliament of the fourth republic of Ghana on the ticket of the National Democratic Congress.

He lost the seat in 1996 Ghanaian general election to Nana Akomea of New Patriotic Party who defeated Agbemor Yeboah Ernest of National Democratic Congress, Ohene Georgina Ama Adumea of Convention People's Party (CPP) Kwaku Owiredu of People's National Congress (PNC) and Corley Clottey Benjamin of Nationalist Congress Party (NCP)  to win the Okaikwei south constituency with 35,284 votes representing 44.70% of the share.

His opponents obtained respectively 22,928 votes representing 29.00% of the share; 1,723 votes representing 2.20% of the share; 1,474 votes representing 1.90% of the share and 1,066 votes representing 1.30% of the share.

Personal life 
He is a Christian.

References 

1954 births
Ghanaian MPs 1993–1997
National Democratic Congress (Ghana) politicians
Ghanaian Christians
Living people
People from Greater Accra Region